The 1961 Dallas mayoral election was held on April 4, 1961.

Results

References 

1961 Texas elections
Dallas
1961
Non-partisan elections